Sylvester Umaru Onu (born 15 June 1938) is a Nigerian judge. He is a former Associate Justice on the Supreme Court of Nigeria from June 1993 to 2014.

Onu is from Egume, in what is now Kogi State. He attended Government College, Keffi, Ahmadu Bello University, Gibson and Weldon, and the Law School at the School of Oriental and African Studies, part of the federal University of London. He held several law-related positions before his appointment to the Court of Appeal in 1984, which he left for the Supreme Court in 1993.

References

External links 

 https://www.forevermissed.com/honjusticesylvester-umaru-onu/about 
 https://infohub.projecttopics.org/1912480-sylvester-umaru-onu

Living people
1938 births
Alumni of SOAS University of London
Supreme Court of Nigeria justices